The 1953 Commonwealth Prime Ministers' Conference was the sixth Meeting of the Heads of Government of the Commonwealth of Nations. It was held in the United Kingdom in June 1953 on the occasion of the coronation of Queen Elizabeth II, and was hosted by that country's Prime Minister, Sir Winston Churchill.

The meeting was held prior to a Three Powers conference between Churchill, US President Dwight Eisenhower, and French Prime Minister Joseph Laniel in Bermuda, which Commonwealth leaders hoped would lead to a Four Powers summit with the Soviet Union. Armistice talks to conclude the Korean War were also discussed. Concerns about the security of the Suez Canal and the importance of maintaining British military installations were also discussed (see Suez War) as were the economic situation and the objectives for development and strengthening of the Pound sterling area set out at the 1952 Commonwealth Prime Ministers' Economic Conference.

Participants

References

1953
Diplomatic conferences in the United Kingdom
20th-century diplomatic conferences
1953 in international relations
1953 in London
United Kingdom and the Commonwealth of Nations
1953 conferences
June 1953 events in the United Kingdom
1950s in the City of Westminster
Winston Churchill
Robert Menzies
Jawaharlal Nehru